Eugen Müller is a Swiss former footballer who played as midfielder. 

Müller joined FC Basel's first team for their 1950–51 season under player-coach Ernst Hufschmid. After five test games Müller played his domestic league debut for the club in the away game on 3 September 1950 as Basel played 1–1 against Biel-Bienne.

Müller played just one season with the club. He played a total of eight games for Basel, without scoring a goal. Two of these games were in the Nationalliga A, one was in the Swiss Cup and the other five were friendly games.

References

Sources
 Die ersten 125 Jahre. Publisher: Josef Zindel im Friedrich Reinhardt Verlag, Basel. 
 Verein "Basler Fussballarchiv" Homepage
(NB: Despite all efforts, the editors of these books and the authors in "Basler Fussballarchiv" have failed to be able to identify all the players, their date and place of birth or date and place of death, who played in the games during the early years of FC Basel)

FC Basel players
Swiss men's footballers
Association football midfielders